Robert Lowe (17 June 1885 – 1928) was an Austrian footballer. He played in one match for the Austria national football team in 1905.

References

External links
 

1885 births
1928 deaths
Austrian footballers
Austria international footballers
Place of birth missing
Association footballers not categorized by position